A Walnut Tree is a Pakistani documentary film by Ammar Aziz. The film is about an internally displaced old man reminiscing about a distant homeland. The film had its world premiere at International Documentary Film Festival Amsterdam in November 2015. In the same month, the film won the award for best film from Film Southasia, Nepal. It was also officially selected for Bangalore International Film Festival, 2016.

References 

2015 films
Pakistani documentary films
Documentary films about refugees
2015 documentary films
Refugees in Pakistan